José María Manuel Magriñat Olivera (1878 – death unknown) was a Cuban outfielder in the Negro leagues and Cuban League in the 1900s and 1910s.

A native of Matanzas, Cuba, Magriñat made his Negro leagues debut in 1906 with the Cuban X-Giants and Cuban Stars (West). With the exception of a season with the All Cubans in 1911, he remained with the Stars through the 1916 season. Magriñat also played several seasons in the Cuban League, and umpired there after his playing career.

References

External links
  and Seamheads

1878 births
Date of birth missing
Year of death missing
Place of death missing
All Cubans players
Carmelita players
Club Fé players
Cuban Stars (West) players
Cuban X-Giants players
Habana players
San Francisco (baseball) players
Sportspeople from Matanzas
Baseball outfielders
Cuban expatriate baseball players in the United States